Richard Crampton may refer to:

Richard S. Crampton, American professor of cardiology
Richard J. Crampton, British professor of history